The Lady of Lebanon (French: La Châtelaine du Liban) is a 1934 French thriller film directed by Jean Epstein, starring Andrée Spinelly and Jean Murat. The narrative is set in Lebanon and follows a web of espionage with clashes between the French and British secret services, with a beautiful young woman at the centre. The film is based on the 1924 novel The Lady of Lebanon by Pierre Benoit. Filming took place between July and December 1933 in Lebanon, France, Egypt, Palestine and Syria. It premiered on 2 February 1934.

The film's sets were designed by the art directors Lucien Aguettand and Claude Bouxin.

Cast
 Jean Murat as captain Domèvre
 Andrée Spinelly as Athelstane, countess Orloff
 Gaby Basset as Maroussia
 Albert Decoeur as the general
 Marguerite Templey as the general's wife
 George Grossmith Jr. as colonel Hobson
 Ernest Ferny as captain Walter
 André Marnay as colonel Hennequin
 Georges Prieur as colonel Maret
 Georgé as Gardafuy
 Acho Chakatouny as Djoun
 Michèle Verly as Michelle

See also
 The Lady of Lebanon, a 1926 film based on the same novel
 The Lebanese Mission, a 1956 film based on the same novel

References

Bibliography
 Dayna Oscherwitz & MaryEllen Higgins. The A to Z of French Cinema. Scarecrow Press, 2009.

External links
 

1934 films
Films based on French novels
Films based on works by Pierre Benoit
Films directed by Jean Epstein
French spy thriller films
1930s French-language films
Pathé films
French black-and-white films
1930s spy thriller films
1930s French films